Chung Mong-koo (born March 19, 1938, in Kangwon Province) is a South Korean businessman. He is the honorary chairman and former CEO of Hyundai Motor Group, Korea's second largest chaebol that manages 54 subsidiaries including Hyundai Motor, Kia Motors, and Hyundai Steel. He started his career in 1970, joining the engineering & construction division of the group. Chung succeeded his father, Chung Ju-yung, the founder of the conglomerate known as the Hyundai Group. When the conglomerate split into several parts in 1999, Chung Mong-koo took over the Hyundai Motor division. He is the eldest surviving son of Chung Ju-yung's eight sons.

He was convicted of embezzlement and breach of fiduciary duty in February 2007, but was given a suspended sentence and was fully pardoned by President Lee Myung-bak.

Education
 Graduated, Kyungbock High School
 Bachelor of Science in industrial engineering, Hanyang University

Professional experience 
 2020–present: Honorary Chairman of Hyundai Motor Co. & Kia Motors Corp. 
 2000–2020: Chairman & CEO of Hyundai Motor Co. & Kia Motors Corp. 
 1996–1998: Chairman of Hyundai Group 
 1987–1998: CEO, Hyundai Motor Service 
 1986: CEO, Incheon Iron & Steel
 1981: CEO, Hyundai Pipe
 1977: CEO, Hyundai Precision & Industry
 1970: started his career by joining Hyundai Engineering & Construction 
He also owns INNOCEAN Worldwide, an ad & marketing agency, with his eldest daughter Chung Sung-yi.

Management
Chung is described as a "vigorous septuagenarian" who comes to work at 6:30 a.m. and "personally heads monthly quality reviews with senior executives".

Although he only holds 5.2% of Hyundai Motor’s stock, Chung "wields disproportionately strong control" and is able to control its board thanks to a complex corporate governance arrangements in which Hyundai Motor owns 34% of Kia, which owns 16.9% of Mobis, which in turn owns 20.8% of Hyundai Motor. This means that "because the companies essentially control each other, no outside shareholder is strong enough to name board members".

Controversies

2007 embezzlement conviction 
In 2006, he and his family were targeted by the Seoul Supreme Prosecutor's Office as part of an investigation into embezzling 100 billion won ($106 million) from Hyundai to create slush funds to bribe officials.
Despite a travel ban, Chung left South Korea in April 2006. Chung was arrested on 28 April 2006 on charges related to embezzlement and other corruption.

On 5 February 2007 he was convicted of embezzlement and breach of fiduciary duty for selling securities to his son Chung Eui-sun at below-market prices. He was sentenced to three years in prison.
Chung remained free on bail while he appealed the sentence.
On September 6, 2007, Chief Judge Lee Jae-hong ruled to suspend the sentence of Chung Mong-koo (in consideration of the huge economic impact of imprisonment), ordering instead of a 3-year jail term, 
community service and a $1 billion donation to charity.

The trial was seen as "a victory for transparency and rule of law in South Korea", but on August 15, 2008, South Korean President Lee Myung-bak granted him a special pardon to allow Chung to continue to contribute to the development of Hyundai Motor Group as well as the Korean economy.

Nepotism
His only son Chung Eui-sun is his "heir apparent", despite his relatively unproven business and leadership skills. According to Bloomberg, "no one can assess how Eui Sun will perform when he becomes chairman because his father keeps him on a tight leash".

Furthermore, in 2011, he was accused of nepotism when Ozen, a bakery cafe whose advisors included his three daughters Sung-yi, Myung-yi, and Yun-yi, set up shop in company buildings. Ozen eventually closed in 2012.

Awards and honors 
 2020: Automotive Hall of Fame
 2009: James A. Van Fleet Award, The Korea Society
 2008–present: Honorary Chairman of the Organizing Committee for the Expo 2012 in Yeosu
 2001: Awarded Distinguished Service Citation by Detroit’s Automotive Hall of Fame
 1997–present: Honorary Vice President of World Archery Federation
 1986–1997: Chairman of Asia Archery Association 
 1985–1997: Chairman of Korea Archery Association

Family

See also
 Automotive industry in South Korea
List of Koreans

References

External links

1938 births
People from Seoul
Living people
South Korean businesspeople
South Korean chairpersons of corporations
South Korean billionaires
Hyundai Motor Group
Hyundai people
Kyungbock High School alumni
South Korean fraudsters
People convicted of embezzlement
Hanyang University alumni
Recipients of South Korean presidential pardons